David Scribner (born July 15, 1957) is an American politician who served in the Connecticut House of Representatives from the 107th district from 1999 to 2015.

References

1957 births
Living people
Republican Party members of the Connecticut House of Representatives